Citrus greening disease (or HLB) is a disease of citrus caused by a vector-transmitted pathogen. The causative agents are motile bacteria, Liberibacter spp. The disease is vectored and transmitted by the Asian citrus psyllid, Diaphorina citri, and the African citrus psyllid, Trioza erytreae, also known as the two-spotted citrus psyllid. It has also been shown to be graft-transmissible. Three different types of HLB are currently known: the heat-tolerant Asian form, and the heat-sensitive African and American forms. The disease was first described in 1929 and first reported in China in 1943. The African variation was first reported in 1947 in South Africa, where it is still widespread. Eventually, it affected the United States, reaching Florida in 2005. Within three years, it had spread to the majority of citrus farms. The rapid increase in this disease has threatened the citrus industry not only in Florida, but the entire US. As of 2009, 33 countries have reported HLB infection in their citrus crop.

Symptoms
HLB is distinguished by the common symptoms of yellowing of the veins and adjacent tissues; followed by splotchy mottling of the entire leaf, premature defoliation, dieback of twigs, decay of feeder rootlets and lateral roots, and decline in vigor, ultimately followed by the death of the entire plant. Affected trees have stunted growth, bear multiple off-season flowers (most of which fall off), and produce small, irregularly shaped fruit with a thick, pale peel that remains green at the bottom and tastes very bitter. Common symptoms can often be mistaken for nutrient deficiencies; however, the distinguishing factor between nutrient deficiencies is the pattern of symmetry. Nutrient deficiencies tend to be symmetrical along the leaf vein margin, while HLB has an asymmetrical yellowing around the vein. The most noticeable symptom of HLB is greening and stunting of the fruit, especially after ripening.

Transmission
HLB was originally thought to be a viral disease, but was later discovered to be caused by bacteria, carried by insect vectors. HLB infection can arise in various climates and is often associated with different species of psyllid insects. For example, citrus crops in Africa become infected under cool conditions as the bacteria are transmitted by the African citrus psyllid Trioza erytreae, an invasive insect that favors cool and moist conditions for optimal growth. Citrus crops in Asia, however, are often infected under warm conditions as the bacteria are transmitted by the Asian citrus psyllid Diaphorina citri.

The young larval stage is the most suitable for acquisition of Ca. L. asiaticus by the Asian citrus psyllid Diaphorina citri, and some cultivars show greater efficiency in transmitting the disease to the vector than others. Temperature also shows a great influence in the parasite-host relationship between the bacteria and the insect vector, affecting how it is acquired and transmitted by the insects.

The causative agents are fastidious phloem-restricted, Gram-negative bacteria in the gracilicutes clade. The Asian form, Ca. L. asiaticus is heat tolerant. This means the greening symptoms can develop at temperatures up to 35 °C. The African form, Ca. L. africanus, and American form, Ca. L. americanus, are heat sensitive, thus symptoms only develop when the temperature is in the range 20–25 °C. Although T. erytreae is the natural vector of African citrus greening and D. citri is the natural vector of American and Asian citrus greening, either psyllid can in fact transmit either of the greening agents under experimental conditions.

Distribution

Distribution of the Asian citrus psyllid that is a vector of the citrus greening disease, is primarily in tropical and subtropical Asia. It has been reported in all citrus-growing regions in Asia except mainland Japan. The disease has affected crops in China, India, Sri Lanka, Malaysia, Indonesia, Myanmar, the Philippines, Pakistan, Thailand, the Ryukyu Islands, Nepal, Saudi Arabia, and Afghanistan. Areas outside Asia have also reported the disease: Réunion, Mauritius, Brazil, Paraguay, and Florida in the U.S. since 2005, and in several municipalities in Mexico since 2009 On March 30, 2012, citrus greening disease was confirmed in a single citrus tree in Hacienda Heights, Los Angeles County, California. The first report of HLB in Texas occurred on January 13, 2012, from a Valencia sweet orange tree in a commercial orchard in San Juan, Texas.  Prospects are bleak for the ubiquitous backyard citrus orchards of California as residential growers are unlikely to consistently use the pesticides which provide effective control in commercial orchards.

The distribution of the African citrus psyllid includes Africa, Madeira, Saudi Arabia, Portugal, and Yemen. This species is sensitive to high temperatures and will not develop at temperatures greater than 25 °C. It is also a vector of the African strain of huanglongbing (Candidatus Liberibacter africanus), which is also sensitive to heat. This strain of HLB is reported to occur in Africa, (Burundi, Cameroon, Central African Republic, Comoros, Ethiopia, Kenya, Madagascar, Malawi, Mauritius, Reunion, Rwanda, South Africa, St. Helena (unconfirmed), Swaziland, Tanzania, Zimbabwe), Saudi Arabia, and Yemen. The disease was not reported in the EU or USA as of 2004; however see above.

Control
Some cultural practices can be effective in managing this disease. Cultural methods include antibacterial management, sanitation, removal of infected plants, frequent scouting, and most importantly, crisis declaration. Tracking the disease will help prevent further infection in other affected areas and help mitigate more local infections if detected early enough.  The Asian citrus psyllid has alternative hosts that may attract psyllids to citrus plants in the vicinity such as Murraya paniculata, Severinia buxifolia, and other plants in the family Rutaceae.

No cure for citrus greening disease is known, and efforts to control it have been slow because infected citrus plants are difficult to maintain, regenerate, and study. Ongoing challenges associated with mitigating disease at the field-scale include seasonality of the phytopathogen (Liberibacter spp.) and associated disease symptoms, limitations for therapeutics to contact the phytopathogen in planta, adverse impacts of broad-spectrum treatments on plant-beneficial microbiota, and potential implications on public and ecosystem health.

No naturally immune citrus cultivars have been identified; however, creating genetically modified citrus may be a possible solution, but questions of its acceptability to consumers exist. A researcher at Texas AgriLife Research reported in 2012 that incorporating two genes from spinach into citrus trees improved resistance to citrus greening disease in greenhouse trials. Field tests by Southern Gardens Citrus of oranges with the spinach genes in Florida are ongoing.

A resistant variety of mandarin orange called 'Bingo' has been bred at the University of Florida. Other varieties can have a partial tolerance to the disease.

Antibiotics
Researchers at the Agricultural Research Service of the United States Department of Agriculture have used lemon trees infected with citrus greening disease to infect periwinkle plants in an effort to study the disease. Periwinkle plants are easily infected with the disease and respond well when experimentally treated with antibiotics. Researchers are testing the effect of penicillin G sodium and biocide 2,2-dibromo-3-nitrilopropionamide as potential treatments for infected citrus plants based on the positive results that were observed when applied to infected periwinkle. In June 2014, the USDA allocated an additional US$31.5 million to expand research combating citrus greening disease.

Certain antibiotics, specifically streptomycin and oxytetracycline, may be effective in the fight against citrus greening disease and have been used in the United States but have been banned in Brazil and the European Union. In 2016, the EPA allowed use of streptomycin and oxytetracycline on orchards with citrus fruits like grapefruits, oranges and tangerines in Florida on an emergency basis, this approval was expanded and broadened to other states for oxytetracycline in December 2018. Further expansion of medically important antibiotics is proposed by the EPA but opposed by the FDA and CDC, primarily as antibiotic resistance can be expected to develop and affect human health.

Peptide
University of California scientists have discovered a peptide that prevented and treated citrus greening disease in greenhouse trials; as of 2021, it is being tested in field trials. The university entered into an exclusive license with Invaio to develop an enhanced injectable version of the product.

Cover crops
Some success has been reported using a cover crop strategy. The citrus trees were not free of the disease bacteria, yet a healthy soil environment allowed them to produce fruit and remain profitable.

See also
 Citrus black spot
 Plant pathology

References

Further reading

External links

 Asian citrus psyllid on the UF / IFAS Featured Creatures Web site
 Species Profile – Citrus Greening and Species Profile – Asian Citrus Psyllid, National Invasive Species Information Center, National Agricultural Library. Lists general information and resources for citrus greening and the Asian citrus psyllid.
 CISR: Huanglongbing/Citrus Greening Center for Invasive Species Research page on Huanglongbing and Citrus Greening

Bacterial citrus diseases
Bacterial tree pathogens and diseases
Candidatus taxa